World Harvest Bible College, now Indiana Christian University, was founded by American Pentacostal priest Lester Sumrall.

World Harvest Bible College may also refer to: 

Valor Christian College, Columbus, Ohio

See also
Harvest Bible College, Melbourne, Australia